Histone H3.3 is a protein that in humans is encoded by the H3-3A, and the H3-3B genes.

Function 

Histones are basic nuclear proteins that are responsible for the nucleosome structure of the chromosomal fiber in eukaryotes. Two molecules of each of the four core histones (H2A, H2B, H3, and H4) form an octamer, around which approximately 146 bp of DNA is wrapped in repeating units, called nucleosomes. The linker histone, H1, interacts with linker DNA between nucleosomes and functions in the compaction of chromatin into higher order structures.

Gene 

This gene contains introns and its mRNA is polyadenylated, unlike most histone genes. The protein encoded is a member of the histone H3 family. Unlike most histone genes, H3F3B is not located in a cluster, but rather is isolated in the telomeric region of chromosome 17.

Clinical significance 

Somatic mutations mostly in the H3F3B gene are associated with chondroblastoma, but some are associated with mutations in H3F3A.  A rare de novo germline mutation of the H3F3B gene (A30P) has been linked to a syndrome with a range of developmental and behavioral abnormalities including microcephaly, mild strabismus, seizure disorder, autistic continuum, hypothyroidism, global developmental delay, and low muscle tone.

References

External links 
  – An ongoing effort to link individuals with H3F3B genetic mutations with researchers who are currently studying this condition.